"Home Alone" is a single by American musician R. Kelly, released from his third solo studio album, R. The song features rapper Keith Murray and uncredited vocals from Kelly Price. It was also produced by G-One & DJ Quik. "Home Alone" was the fifth single from the album and charted at number 65 on the US Billboard Hot 100. Its chart success was better abroad, reaching the top 40 in Canada, France and the United Kingdom. In Canada it topped the RPM Dance Chart.

Music video
The music video was directed by Hype Williams and was shot at the mansion R.Kelly owned at that time.

Live performance
Kelly often raps Keith Murray's part at his concerts.

Charts

Weekly charts

Year-end charts

References

1998 singles
1998 songs
R. Kelly songs
Keith Murray (rapper) songs
Songs written by Kelly Price
Songs written by R. Kelly
Song recordings produced by R. Kelly
Music videos directed by Hype Williams
Jive Records singles